Hemen Gupta was an Indian film director, producer and screenwriter in Hindi language films and Bengali language films.

Early life 
Hemen Gupta was born on 21 March 1914, in Rajmahal, Jharhand, India. His father, Purnanand Gupta, worked in the State Treasury Office and for several years, was posted in Dhaka, Bangladesh, where Hemen spent his early childhood.  His siblings were brothers Jogen, Biren, Rabin, Nripen and sister Amiya. 

Hemen grew up in a very large joint family, together with several uncles, aunts and cousins. He was a good student and completed his high school and undergrad college studies in Dhaka, where he graduated with academic honors. After his undergrad, he moved to Calcutta (now Kolkata) in West Bengal, India.

In Calcutta, he was actively involved in the national revolutionary movement to obtain freedom from British Rule.  He joined the youth wing of the local Congress Party in 1928 and was drawn into what the British authorities considered subversive activities.  

In1931, he was arrested by the British police and convicted on two charges.

1) for alleged complicity in the murder of the Midnapore District Magistrate, Mr. James Peddy  and Robert Douglas

2) for his active participation in the Dacca-Assam Mail Train Robbery Case.

He spent jail terms at, Hijli Jail (now part of Indian Institute of Technology, Kharagpur, West Bengal),  Buxar jail (in the state of Bihar) and Deoli jail (in the state of  Rajasthan) from 1932 to 1938.                                                      

As collateral and punitive damage, his extended family also got incarcerated, whereby several members lost their government jobs and pension benefits. Their family printing business was also forced to shut down.

Professional life 
His major work includes Anand Math (1952), Kabuliwala (1961).

During his jail term, he developed a keen interest in the art and science of film making, which was a new medium of mass communication in those days. While in jail, he resumed academic studies and earned his master's degree in History. Immediately upon his release from prison, he worked in close association with the India's celebrated leader Netaji Subhas Chandra Bose, as his personal secretary. In 1939 he started his film career by joining the renowned New Theatres film studios, Calcutta, as a helper in the studio's costume department. He was later promoted to becoming an Assistant Film Director.  

In 1943, he got his break as a Director, with his first feature film titled “Dwanda” (Conflict).  From 1943 to 1949, he directed seven feature films, mostly in Bengali language. The themes of several of his films were based on India's freedom movement and he drew upon his personal experiences as a radical activist and the years he spent in prison. Most notable amongst these films, was “42” (“Biyallish” in Bengali), Due to its controversial political content, the film was initially rejected by the Board of Film Censors, but later allowed to be released.  It is widely considered to be a milestone film, depicting the Quit India Movement in a village in Bengal, India. It has won universal acclaim and continues to be a perennial favorite amongst that genre of patriotic films. In Calcutta, he introduced film actor Pradeep Kumar Batabyal, music director Hemanta Mukherjee and cameraman Ajoy Kar (who later became a film director).

In 1950, he migrated to Bombay to pursue his film career there. His first film in Bombay was produced by Mr. Sasadhar Mukerji and titled “Anand Math”. This was also a patriotic film based on a novel by the renowned Bengali author Bankim Chandra Chatterji. He also brought his protégés and key technical team from Kolkata to Bombay.  His next film titled Ferry (Kashti in Hindi) in 1952, was a love story that starred Dev Anand and Geeta Bali. It was the official entry from India at the Moscow Film festival.

From 1951 to 1967, Hemen directed seven feature films that were released and three films that remained unfinished, due to his untimely demise. The most acclaimed among them was the film “Kabuliwala’ based on a story by Nobel Laureate author Rabindranath Tagore. It was released in 1961 and it received a silver medal at the Indian National Film awards.  (See external link at the end of this article for additional interesting write up and photographs related to Hemen Gupta).

Filmography

Director

Producer

Screenwriter

References

External links
 
https://cinemaazi.com/feature/hemen-gupta-his-life-and-times

Film producers from Mumbai
Hindi film producers
Hindi-language film directors
Bengali film directors
Film directors from Mumbai
Indian Hindus
20th-century Indian film directors
Indian male screenwriters
Screenwriters from Mumbai
Hindi screenwriters
1967 deaths